Atman or Ātman may refer to:

Film
 Ātman (1975 film), a Japanese experimental short film directed by Toshio Matsumoto
 Atman (1997 film), a documentary film directed by Pirjo Honkasalo

People
 Pavel Atman (born 1987), Russian handball player

Religion
 Ātman (Jainism), or Jīva, a philosophical term used within Jainism to identify the soul
 Ātman (Hinduism), meaning "Self", a philosophical concept common to all schools of Hindu philosophy
 Ātman (Buddhism), attā or attan, a reference to the essential self
 Anattā or anātman — "not-self", central concept in Buddhism
 Atman jnana — "knowledge" in the context of Indian philosophy and religions

See also

 Ataman, a title of Cossack and haidamak leaders of various kinds
 World Soul (disambiguation)
 Atma (disambiguation)
 Divine soul (disambiguation)